Hembiträdet is a 2004 Marie Hermanson novel.

Premise
Yvonne begins her employment as a housemaid for the Ekberg spouses, who lives in a single family house area.

References

2004 Swedish novels
Fictional maids
Swedish-language novels